Kenneth Anthony Adam Nowakowski (born May 16, 1958, North Battleford, Saskatchewan) is the bishop of the Ukrainian Catholic Eparchy of Holy Family of London. He was ordained a priest on August 19, 1989 at St. George's Cathedral in Saskatoon, SK and a bishop on July 24, 2007 in Vancouver, BC. On January 15, 2020, he was appointed as bishop of Ukrainian Catholic Eparchy of Holy Family of London.

References

External links

 https://web.archive.org/web/20140411073221/http://www.ugcc.org.ua/38.0.html

 https://press.vatican.va/content/salastampa/it/bollettino/pubblico/2020/01/15/0027/00061.html#ve

Canadian members of the Ukrainian Greek Catholic Church
Ukrainian Catholic Church in Canada
20th-century Eastern Catholic clergy
Bishops of the Ukrainian Greek Catholic Church
1958 births
Canadian Ukrainian Greek Catholics
Living people
People from North Battleford
21st-century Eastern Catholic bishops
Eastern Catholic bishops in the United Kingdom
Canadian expatriates in England
Pontifical Oriental Institute alumni